Dual specificity protein phosphatase CDC14B is an enzyme that in humans is encoded by the CDC14B gene.

The protein encoded by this gene is a member of the dual specificity protein tyrosine phosphatase family. This protein is highly similar to Saccharomyces cerevisiae Cdc14, a protein tyrosine phosphatase involved in the exit of cell mitosis and initiation of DNA replication, which suggests the role in cell cycle control. Specifically, it is thought to fulfil this role by bundling and stabilising microtubules. This protein has been shown to interact with and dephosphorylates tumor suppressor protein p53, and is thought to regulate the function of p53. Alternative splicing of this gene results in 3 transcript variants encoding distinct isoforms.

Interactions and Functions
CDC14B has been shown to interact with p53, potentially de-phosphorylate p53 at Serine 315 and thereby stabilize p53. S315-phosphorylated p53, in contrast to other p53 phosphorylation, was shown to facilitate p53 degradation. At the patho-physiological level, mice with CDC14B deletion were shown to exhibit early-onset ageing phenotypes.

References

Further reading

External links